The 1950 San Remo Grand Prix was a non-Championship Formula One motor race held on 16 April 1950 at the Autodromo di Ospedaletti, in Sanremo, Liguria, Italy. It was the third race of the 1950 Formula One season. The 90-lap race was won by Alfa Romeo driver Juan Manuel Fangio after starting from second position. Luigi Villoresi finished second in a Ferrari, and Alfredo Piàn third in a Maserati.

Classification

References

Ospedaletti Circuit blog

San Remo
San Remo
San Remo Grand Prix